Subpixel rendering is a way to increase the apparent resolution of a computer's display. It takes advantage of the fact that each pixel on a color liquid crystal display (LCD) or similar is actually composed of individual red, green, and blue subpixels with different locations, so that the color also causes the image to shift in space.

Background

A single pixel on a color subpixelated display is made of several color primaries, typically three colored elements—ordered (on various displays) either as blue, green, and red (BGR), or as red, green, and blue (RGB). Some displays have more than three primaries, often called MultiPrimary, such as the combination of red, green, blue, and yellow (RGBY), or red, green, blue and white (RGBW), or even red, green, blue, yellow, and cyan (RGBYC).

These pixel components, sometimes called subpixels, appear as a single color to the human eye because of blurring by the optics and spatial integration by nerve cells in the eye. The components are easily visible, however, when viewed with a small magnifying glass, such as a loupe. Over a certain resolution threshold the colors in the subpixels are not visible, but the relative intensity of the components shifts the apparent position or orientation of a line.

Subpixel rendering is better suited to some display technologies than others. The technique should have good application to organic light emitting diodes (OLED) and other display technologies that organize pixels the same way as LCDs. In a CRT it would require the designer to know precisely where each pixel hits the display's aperture grille, alignment variations that are part of the production process, and variation in the beam steering electronics, make this virtually impossible.

History and patents
The origin of subpixel rendering as used today remains controversial. Apple, then IBM, and finally Microsoft patented various implementations with certain technical differences owing to the different purposes their technologies were intended for.

Microsoft has several patents in the United States on subpixel rendering technology for text rendering on RGB Stripe layouts. The patents 6,219,025, 6,239,783, 6,307,566, 6,225,973, 6,243,070, 6,393,145, 6,421,054, 6,282,327, 6,624,828 were filed between October 7, 1998, and October 7, 1999, thus should expire on October 7, 2019. Analysis by FreeType of the patent indicates that the idea of subpixel rendering is not covered by the patent, but the actual filter used as a last step to balance the color is. Microsoft's patent describes the smallest filter possible that distributes each subpixel value to an equal amount of R,G, and B pixels. Any other filter will either be blurrier or will introduce color artifacts.

Apple was able to use it in Mac OS X due to a patent cross-licensing agreement.

Apple II

It is sometimes claimed (such as by Steve Gibson) that the Apple II, introduced in 1977, supports an early form of subpixel rendering in its high-resolution (280×192) graphics mode. However, the method Gibson describes can also be viewed as a limitation of the way the machine generates color, rather than as a technique intentionally exploited by programmers to increase resolution.

David Turner of the FreeType project criticized Gibson's theory as to the invention, at least as far as patent law is concerned, in the following way: «For the record, the Wozniak patent is explicitly referenced in the [Microsoft ], and the claims are worded precisely to avoid colliding with it (which is easy, since the Apple II only used 2 "sub-pixels", instead of the 'at minimum 3' claimed by MS).» Turner further explains his view:

The bytes that comprise the Apple II high-resolution screen buffer contain seven visible bits (each corresponding directly to a pixel) and a flag bit used to select between purple/green or blue/orange color sets. Each pixel, since it is represented by a single bit, is either on or off; there are no bits within the pixel itself for specifying color or brightness. Color is instead created as an artifact of the NTSC color encoding scheme, determined by horizontal position: pixels with even horizontal coordinates are always purple (or blue, if the flag bit is set), and odd pixels are always green (or orange). Two lit pixels next to each other are always white, regardless of whether the pair is even/odd or odd/even, and irrespective of the value of the flag bit. The foregoing is only an approximation of the true interplay of the digital and analog behavior of the Apple's video output circuits on one hand, and the properties of real NTSC monitors on the other hand. However, this approximation is what most programmers of the time would have in mind while working with the Apple's high-resolution mode.

Gibson's example claims that because two adjacent bits make a white block, there are in fact two bits per pixel: one which activates the purple left half of the pixel, and the other which activates the green right half of the pixel. If the programmer instead activates the green right half of a pixel and the purple left half of the next pixel, then the result is a white block that is 1/2 pixel to the right, which is indeed an instance of subpixel rendering. However, it is not clear whether any programmers of the Apple II have considered the pairs of bits as pixels—instead calling each bit a pixel. While the quote from Apple II inventor Steve Wozniak on Gibson's page seems to imply that vintage Apple II graphics programmers routinely used subpixel rendering, it is difficult to make a case that many of them thought of what they were doing in such terms.

The flag bit in each byte affects color by shifting pixels half a pixel-width to the right. This half-pixel shift was exploited by some graphics software, such as HRCG (High-Resolution Character Generator), an Apple utility that displayed text using the high-resolution graphics mode, to smooth diagonals. (Many Apple II users had monochrome displays, or turned down the saturation on their color displays when running software that expected a monochrome display, so this technique was useful.) Although it did not provide a way to address subpixels individually, it did allow positioning of pixels at fractional pixel locations and can thus be considered a form of subpixel rendering. However, this technique is not related to LCD subpixel rendering as described in this article.

IBM
IBM's U.S. Patent #5341153 — Filed: 1988-06-13, "Method of and apparatus for displaying a multicolor image" may cover some of these techniques.

ClearType

Microsoft announced its subpixel rendering technology, called ClearType, at COMDEX in 1998. Microsoft published a paper in May of 2000, Displaced Filtering for Patterned Displays describing the filtering behind ClearType. It was then made available in Windows XP, but it was not activated by default until Windows Vista. (Windows XP OEMs however could and did change the default setting.)

FreeType
FreeType, the library used by most current software on the X Window System, contains two open source implementations. The original implementation uses the ClearType antialiasing filters and it carries the following notice: "The colour filtering algorithm of Microsoft's ClearType technology for subpixel rendering is covered by patents; for this reason the corresponding code in FreeType is disabled by default. Note that subpixel rendering per se is prior art; using a different colour filter thus easily circumvents Microsoft's patent claims."

FreeType offers a variety of color filters. Since version 2.6.2, the default filter is light, a filter that is both normalized (value sums up to 1) and color-balanced (eliminate color fringes at the cost of resolution).

Since version 2.8.1, a second implementation exists, called Harmony, that "offers high quality LCD-optimized output without resorting to ClearType techniques of resolution tripling and filtering". This is the method enabled by default. When using this method, "each color channel is generated separately after shifting the glyph outline, capitalizing on the fact that the color grids on LCD panels are shifted by a third of a pixel. This output is indistinguishable from ClearType with a light 3-tap filter." Since the Harmony method does not require additional filtering, it is not covered by the ClearType patents.

SubLCD
SubLCD is another open source subpixel rendering method that claims it does not infringe existing patents, and promises to remain unpatented. It uses a "2-pixel" subpixel rendering, where G is one subpixel, and the R and B of two adjacent pixels are combined into a "purple subpixel", to avoid the Microsoft patent. This also has the claimed advantage of a more equal perceived brightness of the two subpixels, somewhat easier power-of-2 math, and a sharper filter. However it only produces 2/3 the resulting resolution.

David Turner was however skeptical of SubLCD's author's claims: "Unfortunately, I, as the FreeType author, do not share his enthusiasm. The reason is precisely the very vague patent claims [by Microsoft] described previously. To me, there is a non-negligible (even if small) chance, that these claims also cover the SubLCD technique. The situation would probably be different if we could invalidate the broader patent claims, but this is not the case currently."

CoolType
Adobe built their own subpixel renderer called CoolType, so they could display documents the same way across various operating systems: Windows, MacOS, Linux etc. When it was launched around the year 2001, CoolType supported a wider range of fonts than Microsoft's ClearType, which was then limited to TrueType fonts, whereas Adobe's CoolType also supported PostScript fonts (and their OpenType equivalent as well).

OS X 
Mac OS X used to use subpixel rendering as well, as part of Quartz 2D, however it was removed after the introduction of Retina displays. Unlike Microsoft's implementation, which favors a tight fit to the grid (font hinting) to maximize legibility, Apple's implementation prioritizes the shape of the glyphs as set out by their designer.

PenTile 

Starting in 1992, Candice H. Brown Elliott researched subpixel rendering and novel layouts, the PenTile matrix family pixel layout, which worked together with sub pixel rendering algorithms to raise the resolution of color flat-panel displays. In 2000, she co-founded Clairvoyante, Inc. to commercialize these layouts and subpixel rendering algorithms. In 2008, Samsung purchased Clairvoyante and simultaneously funded a new company, Nouvoyance, Inc., retaining much of the technical staff, with Ms. Brown Elliott as CEO.

With subpixel rendering technology, the number of points that may be independently addressed to reconstruct the image is increased. When the green subpixels are reconstructing the shoulders, the red subpixels are reconstructing near the peaks and vice versa. For text fonts, increasing the addressability allows the font designer to use spatial frequencies and phases that would have created noticeable distortions had it been whole pixel rendered. The improvement is most noted on italic fonts which exhibit different phases on each row. This reduction in moiré distortion is the primary benefit of subpixel rendered fonts on the conventional  Stripe panel.

Although subpixel rendering increases the number of reconstruction points on the display this does not always mean that higher resolution, higher spatial frequencies, more lines and spaces, may be displayed on a given arrangement of color subpixels. A phenomenon occurs as the spatial frequency is increased past the whole pixel Nyquist limit from the Nyquist–Shannon sampling theorem; Chromatic aliasing (color fringes) may appear with higher spatial frequencies in a given orientation on the color subpixel arrangement.

Example with the common  stripes layout
For example, consider an  Stripe Panel:

              WWWWWWWWWWWWWWWWWW          = red
      is      WWWWWWWWWWWWWWWWWW          = green
   perceived  WWWWWWWWWWWWWWWWWW  where   = blue
      as      WWWWWWWWWWWWWWWWWW         W = white
              WWWWWWWWWWWWWWWWWW

Shown below is an example of black and white lines at the Nyquist limit, but at a slanting angle, taking advantage of subpixel rendering to use a different phase each row:

 _             WWW__WWW___          = red
 _     is      _WWW__WWW__          = green
 _  perceived  _WWW___WWW_  where   = blue
 _     as      __WWW___WWW         _ = black
 __             WWW__WW         W = white

Shown below is an example of chromatic aliasing when the traditional whole pixel Nyquist limit is exceeded:

                        = red     = yellow
      is                = green   = cyan
   perceived    where   = blue    = magenta
      as               _ = black
              

This case shows the result of attempting to place vertical black and white lines at four subpixels per cycle on the  Stripe architecture. One can visually see that the lines, instead of being white, are colored. Starting from the left, the first line is red combined with green to produce a yellow-colored line. The second line is green combined with blue to produce a pastel cyan-colored line. The third line is blue combined with red to produce a magenta-colored line. The colors then repeat: yellow, cyan, and magenta. This demonstrates that a spatial frequency of one cycle per four subpixels is too high. Attempts to go to a yet higher spatial frequency, such as one cycle per three subpixels, would result in a single solid color.

Some LCDs compensate the inter-pixel color mix effect by having borders between pixels slightly larger than borders between subpixels. Then, in the example above, a viewer of such an LCD would see a blue line appearing adjacent to a red line instead of a single magenta line.

Example with - alternated stripes layout
Novel subpixel layouts have been developed to allow higher real resolution without chromatic aliasing. Shown here is one of the member of the PenTile matrix family of layouts. Shown below is an example of how a simple change to the arrangement of color subpixels may allow a higher limit in the horizontal direction:

 
 
 
 
 
 

In this case, the red and green order are interchanged every row to create a red & green checkerboard pattern with blue stripes. Note that the vertical subpixels could be split in half vertically to double the vertical resolution as well : the current LCD panels already typically use two color LEDs (aligned vertically and displaying the same lightness, see the zoomed images below) to illuminate each vertical subpixel. This layout is one of the PenTile matrix family of layouts. When displaying the same number of black-white lines, the blue subpixels are set at half brightness "":

 __
 __
 __
 __
 __
 __

Notice that every column that turns on comprises red and green subpixels at full brightness and blue subpixels at half value to balance it to white. Now, one may display black and white lines at up to one cycle per three subpixels without chromatic aliasing, twice that of the  Stripe architecture.

Non-striped variants of the - alternated layout

Variants of the previous layout have been proposed by Clairvoyante/Nouvoyance (and demonstrated by Samsung) as members of the PenTile matrix family of layouts specifically designed for subpixel rendering efficiency.

For example, taking advantage of the doubled visible horizontal resolution, one could double the vertical resolution to make the definition more isotropic. However this would reduce the aperture of pixels, producing lower contrasts. A better alternative uses the fact that the blue subpixels are those that contribute the least to the visible intensity, so that they are less precisely located by the eye. Blue subpixels are then rendered just as a diamond in the center of a pixel square, and the rest of the pixel surface is split in four parts as a checker board of red and green subpixels with smaller sizes. Rendering images with this variant can use the same technique as before, except that now there's a near-isotropic geometry that supports both the horizontal and the vertical with the same geometric properties, making the layout ideal for displaying the same image details when the LCD panel can be rotated.

The doubled vertical and horizontal visual resolution allows to reduce the subpixel density of about 33%, in order to increase their aperture also of about 33%, with the same separation distance between subpixels (for their electronic interconnection), and also to reduce the power dissipation of about 50% with a white/black contrast increased of about 50% and still a visual-pixel resolution enhanced by about 33% (i.e. about 125 dpi instead of 96 dpi), but with only half the total number of subpixels for the same displayed surface.

Checkered -W layout
Another variant, called the W Quad, uses a checkerboard with 4 subpixels per pixel, adding a white subpixel, or more specifically, replacing one of the green subpixels of Bayer filter Pattern with a white subpixel, to increase the contrast and reduce the energy needed to illuminate white pixels (because color filters in classic  striped panels absorb more than 65% of the total white light used to illuminate the panel). As each subpixel is a square instead of a thin rectangle, this also increases the aperture with the same average subpixel density, and same pixel density along both axis. As the horizontal density is reduced and the vertical density remains identical (for the same square pixel density), it becomes possible to increase the pixel density of about 33%, while maintaining the contrast comparable to classic  or  panels, taking profit of the more efficient use of light and lowered absorption levels by the color filters.

It is not possible to use subpixel rendering to increase the resolution without creating color fringes similar to those seen in classic  or  striped panels, but the increased resolution compensates it, in addition, their effective visible color is reduced by the presence of "color-neutral" white subpixels.

However, this layout allows a better rendering of greys, at the price of a lower color separation. But this is consistent with human vision and with modern image and video compression formats (like JPEG and MPEG) used in modern HDTV transmissions and in Blu-ray Discs.

Yet another variant, a member for the PenTile matrix family of subpixel layouts, alternates between subpixel order W / W every other row, to allow subpixel rendering to increase the resolution, without chromatic aliasing. As before, the increased transmittance using the white subpixel allows higher subpixel density, but in this case, the displayed resolution is even higher due to the benefits of subpixel rendering:

 WWW
 WWW
 WWW
 WWW
 ___
 _W__W__
 ___
 _W__W__

Visual resolution versus pixel resolution and software compatibility
Thus, not all layouts are created equal. Each particular layout may have a different "visual resolution", modulation transfer function limit (MTFL), defined as the highest number of black and white lines that may be simultaneously rendered without visible chromatic aliasing.

However, the PenTile matrix displays have a built-in subpixel rendering engine that allows conventional  data sets to be converted to the layouts, providing plug'n'play compatibility with conventional layout displays. New display models should be proposed in the future that will allow monitor drivers to specify their visual resolution separately from the full pixel resolution and the relative position offsets of visible subpixels for each color plane, as well as their respective contribution to white intensity. Such monitor drivers would allow renderers to correctly adjust their geometry transform matrices in order to correctly compute the values of each color plane, and take the best profit of subpixel rendering with the lowest chromatic aliasing.

Examples
Photos were taken with a Canon PowerShot A470 digital camera using "Super Macro" mode and 4.0× digital zoom. The screen used was that integrated into a Lenovo G550 laptop. Note that the display has RGB pixels. Displays exist in all four patterns horizontal RGB/BGR and vertical RGB/BGR but horizontal RGB is the most common. In addition, several color subpixel patterns have been developed specifically to take advantage of subpixel rendering. The best known of these is the PenTile matrix family of patterns.

The composite photographs below show three methods of fonts rendering for comparison. From top: Monochrome; Traditional (whole pixel) spatial anti-aliasing; Subpixel rendering.

See also
CoolType
Font rasterization
Kell factor
Sub-pixel resolution

References

External links
 Former IBM researcher Ron Feigenblatt's remarks on Microsoft ClearType
 
 John Daggett's Subpixel Explorer—requires Firefox to display properly
 Texts Rasterization Exposures Article from the Anti-Grain Geometry Project.
  http://jankautz.com/publications/SubpixelCGF13.pdf
 http://www.cahk.hk/innovationforum/subpixel_rendering.pdf

Computer graphics
Vector graphics

cs:Subpixel
nl:Subpixel
sk:Subpixel